State Route 172 (SR 172) is part of Maine's system of numbered state highways, located in Hancock County. It runs from SR 175 in Sedgwick to U.S. Route 1 (US 1) and SR 3 in Ellsworth.

Junction list

See also

References

External links

Floodgap Roadgap's RoadsAroundME: Maine State Route 172

172
Transportation in Hancock County, Maine